Maas van der Feen (1 February 1888 – 10 March 1973) was a Dutch tennis player. He competed in the men's singles and doubles events at the 1924 Summer Olympics.

References

External links
 

1888 births
1973 deaths
Dutch male tennis players
Olympic tennis players of the Netherlands
Tennis players at the 1924 Summer Olympics
People from Smallingerland
Sportspeople from Friesland